Bert Johan Esselink (born 16 August 1999) is a Dutch professional footballer who plays as a centre-back for Cypriot First Division club Olympiakos Nicosia on loan from APOEL.

Club career

Early career
Born in 's-Heerenberg, started his career in the youth academy of Dutch club De Graafschap, before joining his first senior club PAEEK in 2020.

PAEEK
On 15 July 2020, it was officially announced that Esselink signed for PAEEK until June 2021.

He made his professional debut in the Cypriot Second Division for PAEEK on 12 September 2020 in a game against Achyronas Liopetriou.

On 27 June 2021, PAEEK announced the renewal of Esselink contract until 31 May 2022.

APOEL

On 9 January 2022, it was officially announced that Esselink signed for APOEL until 2024. The exceptional performances of the 22-year-old Dutch defender at PAEEK, made APOEL to pay the release clause to PAEEK.

Olympiakos Nicosia

On 26 August 2022, he was loaned for a year to Olympiakos Nicosia.

Career statistics

Honours

Club
PAEEK
Cypriot Second Division: 2020–21

References

External links

1999 births
Living people
Dutch footballers
Association football central defenders
De Graafschap players
PAEEK players
APOEL FC players
Olympiakos Nicosia players
Dutch expatriate footballers
Expatriate footballers in Cyprus
Dutch expatriate sportspeople in Cyprus